Statistics of Belgian First Division in the 1906–07 season.

Overview

It was contested by 10 teams, and Union Saint-Gilloise won the championship.

League standings

Results

See also
1906–07 in Belgian football

References

Belgian Pro League seasons
Belgian First Division, 1913-14
1906–07 in Belgian football